The list of shipwrecks in 1824 includes some ships sunk, wrecked or otherwise lost during 1824.

January

February

March

April

May

June

July

August

September

October

November

December

Unknown date

References

1824